Soma Banerjee is an Indian  film and television actress, who predominantly works in Bengali cinema and serials.
She made her debut in DD Bangla's serial Janmobhumi and became popular with the role of Heera Amma in Star Jalsha's Maa....Tomay Chara Ghum Ashena serial. She has acted in many serials including Bhojo Gobindho, Aparajita Apu and Uma.

Works

Films
 Brahma Janen Gopon Kommoti (2020)
 Naqaab (2018)
 Bindaas (2014)
 Chirodini Tumi Je Amar 2 (2013)
 Bandhu (2007)

Television

References

External links 
 

Living people
Actresses in Bengali cinema
Bengali television actresses
Indian film actresses
Indian television actresses
21st-century Indian actresses
Year of birth missing (living people)